Lalpur is a census town and a gram panchayat within the jurisdiction of the Mathurapur police station in  the Mathurapur I CD block in the Diamond Harbour subdivision of the South 24 Parganas district in the Indian state of West Bengal.

Geography

Area overview
Diamond Harbour subdivision is a rural subdivision with patches of urbanization. Only 14.61% of the population lives in the urban areas and an overwhelming 85.39% lives in the rural areas. In the eastern portion of the subdivision (shown in the map alongside) there are 24 census towns. The entire district is situated in the Ganges Delta and the eastern part of the district is a flat plain area with small towns, many in clusters. Location of places in the larger map varies a little. It is an OpenStreetMap, while we are using coordinates as in Google Maps.

Note: The map alongside presents some of the notable locations in the subdivision. All places marked in the map are linked in the larger full screen map.

Location
Lalpur  is located at

Demographics
According to the 2011 Census of India, Lalpur had a total population of 4,691 of which 2436 (52%) were males and 2,255 (48%) were females. There were  786 persons in the age range of 0–6 years. The total number of literate persons in Lalpur was 2,924 (74.88% of the population over 6 years).

Infrastructure
According to the District Census Handbook 2011, Lalpur covered an area of 0.5577 km2. Among the physical aspects, there is a railway station at Mathurapur Road 5 km away. Among the civic amenities, the protected water supply involved hand pumps, tap water from untreated sources. It had 348 domestic electric connections. Among the medical facilities it had 1 dispensary/ health, 4 medicine shops. Among the educational facilities it had was 1 primary school, the nearest higher school facilities at Krishna Chandrapur 1 km away. An important commodity it produced was paddy.

Transport
Bishnupur-Raidighi Road links Lalpur to the State Highway 1.

Mathurapur Road railway station is located nearby.

Healthcare
Mathurapur Rural Hospital at Mathurapur, with 60 beds, is the major government medical facility in the Mathurapur I CD block.

References

Cities and towns in South 24 Parganas district